Pheophorbidase (EC 3.1.1.82, phedase, PPD) is an enzyme with systematic name pheophorbide-a hydrolase. It catalyses the following reaction:

 pheophorbide a + H2O  pyropheophorbide a + methanol + CO2 (overall reaction)
 (1a) pheophorbide a + H2O  C-132-carboxypyropheophorbide a + methanol
 (1b) C-132-carboxypyropheophorbide a  pyropheophorbide a + CO2 (spontaneous)

This enzyme participates in the chlorophyll degradation in higher plants and algae.

References

External links 
 

EC 3.1.1